Viewpoint is a Canadian current affairs television program which aired on CBC Television from 1957 to 1976.

Premise
This program began in late 1957 to feature analysis, interviews and opinion involving various individuals following CBC's national newscast.

In one episode, for example, the Financial Post'''s Clive Baxter attempted to grill Stanley Knowles regarding plans to form what would become the New Democratic Party.

An equivalent French-language program, Commentaires, began on Radio-Canada in 1959.

In 1975, the CBC's director of information programming (Knowlton Nash) cancelled Viewpoint under the pretext that the program caused the following local newscasts at 11:30 p.m. to lose three-quarters of their viewership ratings. A new public affairs background program was scheduled for Viewpoint''s time slot, beginning on 5 January 1976.

References

External links

1957 Canadian television series debuts
1976 Canadian television series endings
1950s Canadian television news shows
1960s Canadian television news shows
1970s Canadian television news shows
Black-and-white Canadian television shows
CBC Television original programming